Parsonby is a hamlet in the Allerdale district of the English county of Cumbria. It is located on the B5301 road, south of Aspatria.

Governance
Parsonby, is part of the Workington constituency of the UK parliament. The current Member of Parliament is Sue Hayman, a member of the Labour Party. The Labour Party has won the seat in every general election since 1979; the Conservative Party has only been elected once in Workington since the Second World War: in the  1976 Workington by-election.

For Local Government purposes it is in the Aspatria Ward of Allerdale Borough Council and the Bothel and Wharrels Ward of Cumbria County Council.

The village also has its own Parish Council jointly with nearby Plumbland; Plumbland Parish Council Parish Council.

For the European Parliament residents in Parsonby voted to elect MEP's for the North West England constituency.

See also

Listed buildings in Plumbland

References

Hamlets in Cumbria
Plumbland